Jaime Churches (born August 23, 1988) is an American politician and educator serving as a member of the Michigan House of Representatives for the 27th district. Elected in November 2022, she assumed office on January 1, 2023.

Early life and education 
Born in Snellville, Georgia, Churches was raised in the Downriver region of Metro Detroit. She earned a Bachelor of Science in education and a Master of Science in educational administration from Madonna University.

Career 
Churches worked as a student teacher at several elementary schools before joining Wegienka Elementary School as a full-time, fifth grade teacher in 2012. From 2005 to 2012, she worked as a summer camp director at the Building Blocks Daycare and Learning Center. Since 2018, she has worked as a fifth grade teacher in the Grosse Ile Township Schools. Churches was elected to the Michigan House of Representatives in November 2022.

References 

1988 births
People from Snellville, Georgia
People from Metro Detroit
Madonna University alumni
Democratic Party members of the Michigan House of Representatives
Women state legislators in Michigan
21st-century American politicians
21st-century American women politicians
Living people